Timothy Allen Harris (born June 15, 1961) is a former American football running back who played one season with the Pittsburgh Steelers of the National Football League. He played college football at Washington State University and attended Compton High School in Compton, California.

References

External links
Just Sports Stats

Living people
1961 births
Players of American football from Compton, California
American football running backs
Washington State Cougars football players
Pittsburgh Steelers players
Seattle Seahawks players
National Football League replacement players